Biathlon at the 2011 Canada Winter Games was held at the Ski Martock near Windsor, Nova Scotia. 

The events will be held during the first week between February 13 and 18, 2011.

Medal table
The following is the medal table for alpine skiing at the 2011 Canada Winter Games.

Men's events

Women's events

References

2011 in biathlon
2011 Canada Winter Games